Aspergillus turcosus is a species of fungus in the genus Aspergillus. It is from the Fumigati section. The species was first described in 2008. It has been reported to produce kotanins.

Growth and morphology

A. turcosus has been cultivated on both Czapek yeast extract agar (CYA) plates and Malt Extract Agar Oxoid® (MEAOX) plates. The growth morphology of the colonies can be seen in the pictures below.

References 

turcosus
Fungi described in 2008